"Move" is the second single released by American rapper/producer Q-Tip from his album The Renaissance. Produced by J Dilla, it samples "Dancing Machine" by The Jackson 5.

Music video
The video for this single premiered on BET's 106 & Park on November 4, 2008.  Q-Tip appeared on the show and discussed the release date of his album. The video borrows from Michael Jackson's "Rock with You" video. It was directed by Rik Cordero.

External links

 Q-Tip — official site.
 Q-Tip at MySpace.

Q-Tip (musician) songs
2008 singles
Song recordings produced by J Dilla
Songs written by Dean Parks
Songs written by Q-Tip (musician)
Songs written by Hal Davis
2008 songs
Universal Motown Records singles